Club Xuventú Sanxenxo is a Spanish football team based in the municipality of Sanxenxo. Xuventú Sanxenxo currently plays in the Preferente Autonómica de Galicia.

Season to season

4 seasons in Tercera División

External links
Futbolme team profile 
Arefe Regional team profile 

Football clubs in Galicia (Spain)
Association football clubs established in 1983
1983 establishments in Spain